YZ, Y.Z., or Yz may refer to:

Astronomy
 YZ Canis Minoris, a red dwarf star in the constellation  Canis Minor
 YZ Cassiopeiae, a star system in the constellation Cassiopeia
 YZ Ceti, a red dwarf star in the constellation Cetus

Transportation
 China Rail hard seat class YZ
 BMP YZ, the YZ series of drones from BMP
 Yamaha YZ motorcycles, see List of Yamaha motorcycles
 Yuanzheng rockets
 Yokomo YZ-834B, an electric powered remote-controlled vehicle

Entertainment
 YZ (rapper), a U.S. musician
 YZ (film), a 2016 Marathi-language film
 Yz (comics), a DC Comics character

Other uses
 YZ Group, an assumed group of ancient Greek Attic vase painters of the red-figure style

See also

 
 
ZY (disambiguation)